Astranthium robustum, the Texas western-daisy, is a North American species of flowering plants in the family Asteraceae. It is found only in the western (trans-Pecos) part of the US State of Texas.

Astranthium robustum is an annual with a taproot, and usually with several stems up to 50 cm (20 inches) tall. Flower heads have white or bluish ray florets and yellow disc florets.

References

Astereae
Flora of Texas
Plants described in 1950